The 1981–82 NBA season was the Detroit Pistons' 34th season in the NBA and 25th season in the city of Detroit.  The team played in the Detroit suburbs at the Pontiac Silverdome.

The Pistons had the second pick in the 1981 NBA Draft and chose Isiah Thomas from Indiana, adding a future Hall of Fame player for the centerpiece of the rebuilding franchise.  The team finished greatly improved, 39-43 (.476), 3rd in the Central Division, an 18-game improvement from the previous season.  The team was led by a pair of rookies, guard Thomas (17.0 ppg, 7.8 apg, NBA All-Star, NBA All Rookie Team) and forward Kelly Tripucka (21.6 ppg, NBA All-Star, NBA All Rookie Team), along with guard John Long (21.9 ppg)  The team also picked up center Bill Laimbeer (12.8 ppg, 11.3 rpg) in a trade with Cleveland and guard Vinnie Johnson from Seattle (7.7 ppg), two key components of future championship Piston teams.

Draft picks

Roster

Regular season

Season standings

z - clinched division title
y - clinched division title
x - clinched playoff spot

Record vs. opponents

Game log

Regular season

|- align="center" bgcolor="#ccffcc"
| 1
| October 30
| Milwaukee
| W 118–113
|
|
|
| Pontiac Silverdome
| 1–0
|- align="center" bgcolor="#ccffcc"
| 2
| October 31
| @ Chicago

|- align="center" bgcolor="#ccffcc"
| 3
| November 5
| New Jersey
| W 109–103
|
|
|
| Pontiac Silverdome
| 3–0
|- align="center" bgcolor="#ffcccc"
| 4
| November 6
| @ Washington
| L 82–86
|
|
|
| Capital Centre
| 3–1
|- align="center" bgcolor="#ffcccc"
| 5
| November 7
| Boston
| L 88–129
|
|
|
| Pontiac Silverdome
| 3–2
|- align="center" bgcolor="#ffcccc"
| 6
| November 10
| Philadelphia
| L 93–95
|
|
|
| Pontiac Silverdome
| 3–3
|- align="center" bgcolor="#ccffcc"
| 7
| November 12
| Cleveland
|- align="center" bgcolor="#ccffcc"
| 8
| November 14
| @ Atlanta
| W 117–104
|
|
|
| The Omni
| 5–3
|- align="center" bgcolor="#ffcccc"
| 9
| November 18
| @ Cleveland
|- align="center" bgcolor="#ccffcc"
| 10
| November 19
| Washington
| W 122–97
|
|
|
| Pontiac Silverdome
| 6–4
|- align="center" bgcolor="#ccffcc"
| 11
| November 21
| Utah
|- align="center" bgcolor="#ffcccc"
| 12
| November 24
| @ Milwaukee
| L 95–103
|
|
|
| MECCA Arena
| 7–5
|- align="center" bgcolor="#ccffcc"
| 13
| November 25
| @ Kansas City
|- align="center" bgcolor="#ffcccc"
| 14
| November 27
| Atlanta
| L 112–114 (OT)
|
|
|
| Pontiac Silverdome
| 8–6
|- align="center" bgcolor="#ffcccc"
| 15
| November 28
| @ Philadelphia
| L 103–116
|
|
|
| The Spectrum
| 8–7

|- align="center" bgcolor="#ffcccc"
| 16
| December 1
| @ New York
|- align="center" bgcolor="#ffcccc"
| 17
| December 2
| @ Boston
| L 114–115
|
|
|
| Boston Garden
| 8–9
|- align="center" bgcolor="#ffcccc"
| 18
| December 4
| @ Indiana
|- align="center" bgcolor="#ffcccc"
| 19
| December 5
| Milwaukee
| L 108–111
|
|
|
| Pontiac Silverdome
| 8–11
|- align="center" bgcolor="#ffcccc"
| 20
| December 10
| New York
|- align="center" bgcolor="#ffcccc"
| 21
| December 12
| @ Seattle
| L 111–117
|
|
|
| Kingdome
| 8–13
|- align="center" bgcolor="#ffcccc"
| 22
| December 13
| @ Portland
|- align="center" bgcolor="#ccffcc"
| 23
| December 15
| @ Golden State
|- align="center" bgcolor="#ffcccc"
| 24
| December 17
| Indiana
|- align="center" bgcolor="#ccffcc"
| 25
| December 19
| New York
|- align="center" bgcolor="#ccffcc"
| 26
| December 22
| @ Dallas
|- align="center" bgcolor="#ccffcc"
| 27
| December 23
| @ Denver
| W 124–119
|
|
|
| McNichols Sports Arena
| 12–15
|- align="center" bgcolor="#ccffcc"
| 28
| December 26
| Chicago
|- align="center" bgcolor="#ffcccc"
| 29
| December 29
| @ Washington
| L 125–129
|
|
|
| Capital Centre
| 13–16
|- align="center" bgcolor="#ffcccc"
| 30
| December 30
| @ New Jersey
| L 119–130
|
|
|
| Brendan Byrne Arena
| 13–17

|- align="center" bgcolor="#ffcccc"
| 31
| January 2
| @ New York
|- align="center" bgcolor="#ccffcc"
| 32
| January 5
| Philadelphia
| W 124–101
|
|
|
| Pontiac Silverdome
| 14–18
|- align="center" bgcolor="#ffcccc"
| 33
| January 7
| Phoenix
| L 94–110
|
|
|
| Pontiac Silverdome
| 14–19
|- align="center" bgcolor="#ffcccc"
| 34
| January 9
| Los Angeles
| L 127–130
|
|
|
| Pontiac Silverdome
| 14–20
|- align="center" bgcolor="#ffcccc"
| 35
| January 10
| @ Boston
| L 124–134
|
|
|
| Hartford Civic Center
| 14–21
|- align="center" bgcolor="#ccffcc"
| 36
| January 12
| @ Chicago
|- align="center" bgcolor="#ffcccc"
| 37
| January 14
| Washington
| L 114–121
|
|
|
| Pontiac Silverdome
| 15–22
|- align="center" bgcolor="#ffcccc"
| 38
| January 16
| Boston
| L 120–128
|
|
|
| Pontiac Silverdome
| 15–23
|- align="center" bgcolor="#ccffcc"
| 39
| January 17
| @ Milwaukee
| W 108–103
|
|
|
| MECCA Arena
| 16–23
|- align="center" bgcolor="#ffcccc"
| 40
| January 19
| @ Utah
|- align="center" bgcolor="#ccffcc"
| 41
| January 21
| @ San Diego
|- align="center" bgcolor="#ffcccc"
| 42
| January 22
| @ Los Angeles
| L 111–123
|
|
|
| The Forum
| 17–25
|- align="center" bgcolor="#ffcccc"
| 43
| January 23
| @ Phoenix
| L 90–113
|
|
|
| Arizona Veterans Memorial Coliseum
| 17–26
|- align="center" bgcolor="#ccffcc"
| 44
| January 27
| Atlanta
| W 108–107
|
|
|
| Pontiac Silverdome
| 18–26

|- align="center" bgcolor="#ccffcc"
| 45
| February 2
| @ Atlanta
| W 106–105
|
|
|
| The Omni
| 19–26
|- align="center" bgcolor="#ccffcc"
| 46
| February 5
| @ Chicago
|- align="center" bgcolor="#ffcccc"
| 47
| February 6
| New Jersey
| L 120–125
|
|
|
| Pontiac Silverdome
| 20–27
|- align="center" bgcolor="#ccffcc"
| 48
| February 9
| Chicago
|- align="center" bgcolor="#ffcccc"
| 49
| February 10
| @ New Jersey
| L 108–115
|
|
|
| Brendan Byrne Arena
| 21–28
|- align="center" bgcolor="#ccffcc"
| 50
| February 11
| Cleveland
|- align="center" bgcolor="#ffcccc"
| 51
| February 13
| Portland
|- align="center" bgcolor="#ccffcc"
| 52
| February 16
| Houston
| W 111–109
|
|
|
| Pontiac Silverdome
| 23–29
|- align="center" bgcolor="#ffcccc"
| 53
| February 17
| @ San Antonio
| L 112–126
|
|
|
| HemisFair Arena
| 23–30
|- align="center" bgcolor="#ccffcc"
| 54
| February 20
| Indiana
|- align="center" bgcolor="#ffcccc"
| 55
| February 25
| San Antonio
| L 116–119
|
|
|
| Pontiac Silverdome
| 24–31
|- align="center" bgcolor="#ccffcc"
| 56
| February 27
| Kansas City
|- align="center" bgcolor="#ffcccc"
| 57
| February 28
| @ Indiana

|- align="center" bgcolor="#ffcccc"
| 58
| March 2
| @ Milwaukee
| L 91–101
|
|
|
| MECCA Arena
| 25–33
|- align="center" bgcolor="#ccffcc"
| 59
| March 4
| Chicago
|- align="center" bgcolor="#ccffcc"
| 60
| March 6
| @ New York
|- align="center" bgcolor="#ffcccc"
| 61
| March 8
| Boston
| L 101–111
|
|
|
| Pontiac Silverdome
| 27–34
|- align="center" bgcolor="#ffcccc"
| 62
| March 10
| Denver
| L 113–124
|
|
|
| Pontiac Silverdome
| 27–35
|- align="center" bgcolor="#ccffcc"
| 63
| March 12
| Golden State
|- align="center" bgcolor="#ccffcc"
| 64
| March 14
| @ Cleveland
|- align="center" bgcolor="#ccffcc"
| 65
| March 16
| San Diego
|- align="center" bgcolor="#ccffcc"
| 66
| March 18
| Seattle
| W 119–115
|
|
|
| Pontiac Silverdome
| 31–35
|- align="center" bgcolor="#ccffcc"
| 67
| March 19
| @ Houston
| W 111–102
|
|
|
| The Summit
| 32–35
|- align="center" bgcolor="#ffcccc"
| 68
| March 21
| @ Atlanta
| L 111–119
|
|
|
| The Omni
| 32–36
|- align="center" bgcolor="#ccffcc"
| 69
| March 25
| Philadelphia
| W 100–98
|
|
|
| Pontiac Silverdome
| 33–36
|- align="center" bgcolor="#ffcccc"
| 70
| March 26
| @ Boston
| L 104–125
|
|
|
| Boston Garden
| 33–37
|- align="center" bgcolor="#ccffcc"
| 71
| March 27
| @ New Jersey
| W 123–121
|
|
|
| Brendan Byrne Arena
| 34–37
|- align="center" bgcolor="#ffcccc"
| 72
| March 30
| @ Washington
| L 98–127
|
|
|
| Capital Centre
| 34–38
|- align="center" bgcolor="#ffcccc"
| 73
| March 31
| @ Indiana

|- align="center" bgcolor="#ffcccc"
| 74
| April 1
| Dallas
|- align="center" bgcolor="#ccffcc"
| 75
| April 3
| Indiana
|- align="center" bgcolor="#ccffcc"
| 76
| April 7
| Atlanta
| W 120–115
|
|
|
| Pontiac Silverdome
| 36–40
|- align="center" bgcolor="#ffcccc"
| 77
| April 9
| Milwaukee
| L 100–118
|
|
|
| Pontiac Silverdome
| 36–41
|- align="center" bgcolor="#ccffcc"
| 78
| April 11
| New York
|- align="center" bgcolor="#ffcccc"
| 79
| April 14
| @ Philadelphia
| L 111–119
|
|
|
| The Spectrum
| 37–42
|- align="center" bgcolor="#ccffcc"
| 80
| April 15
| Cleveland
|- align="center" bgcolor="#ffcccc"
| 81
| April 17
| New Jersey
| L 132–147
|
|
|
| Pontiac Silverdome
| 38–43
|- align="center" bgcolor="#ccffcc"
| 82
| April 18
| @ Cleveland

Player statistics

Awards and records
Isiah Thomas, NBA All-Rookie Team 1st Team
Kelly Tripucka, NBA All-Rookie Team 1st Team

References

See also
1981-82 NBA season

Detroit Pistons seasons
Det
Detroit Pistons
Detroit Pistons